Below is a list of notable people born in Ohrid, North Macedonia or its surroundings:

 Kosta Abrašević, poet
 Valon Ahmedi, footballer
 Arabacı Ali Pasha, Grand Vizier of the Ottoman Empire
 Eyüp Sabri Akgöl, Ottoman revolutionary and Turkish politician 
 Atina Bojadži, marathon swimmer
 Kliment Boyadzhiev, general and minister
 Vladimir Četkar, singer
 Živko Čingo, writer
 Andrea Gropa, lord of Ohrid
 Dervish Hima, signatory of the Albanian Declaration of Independence
 Ohrili Hüseyin Pasha, Grand Vizier of the Ottoman Empire
 Mišo Juzmeski, writer and photographer
 Kaliopi, singer-songwriter
 Grigor Koprov, pop music composer
 Erik Lloga, community leader of Albanian-Australians
 Sehadete Mekuli, physician
 Aleksandar Mitreski, footballer
 Eva Nedinkovska, singer
 Hamdi Ohri, 19th century Albanian Rilindas
 Zyhdi Ohri, signatory of the Albanian Declaration of Independence
 Cedi Osman, basketball player
 Cyril Parlichev, revolutionary
 Grigor Parlichev, writer and translator
 Anastasios Pehion, educator and revolutionary
 Cincar Janko Popović, one of the leaders of the First Serbian Uprising
 Aleksandar Protogerov, politician and revolutionary
 Redžep Selman, triple jumper
 Kuzman Shapkarev, folklorist and scientist
 Gjoko Taneski, singer and Eurovision entrant in 2010
 Hristo Uzunov, revolutionary

References and notes

Ohrid